The Abnormal Importations (Customs Duties) Act 1931 (22 & 23 Geo. V c. 1) was an Act of the Parliament of the United Kingdom enacted on 20 November 1931 which gave the Board of Trade, with the agreement of HM Treasury, the power to impose or raise duties up to 100% ad valorem on specific imported goods which were imported in "abnormal quantities". Each order under this power would be put before the House of Commons immediately and would expire in 28 days unless the Commons extended it by resolution. It had a lifespan of six months and was not extended.

Notes

United Kingdom Acts of Parliament 1931
Economic history of the United Kingdom
1930s economic history